Charlotte Virginia Henry  (March 3, 1914 – April 11, 1980) was an American actress who is best remembered for her roles in Alice in Wonderland (1933) and Babes in Toyland (1934). She also starred in the Frank Buck serial Jungle Menace (1937).

Early years
Henry was born in Brooklyn, New York to Robert Emmett Henry (1891–1952) and Charlotte Ann Sayers Henry (1891–1971). She began modelling at a very young age, and was always fascinated by the theatre. At age 14, she was cast in an important role in Courage, a hit Broadway play, in 1928.

Hollywood
The following year, Charlotte's mother brought her to Hollywood. She repeated her part in the movie version of Courage (1930) and enrolled at Lawlors, the school for professional children. Some of her classmates were Frankie Darro, Anita Louise, and Betty Grable. Junior Durkin, who had worked with her in Courage, suggested Charlotte for a play in which he was appearing at the Pasadena Playhouse. By then, she had appeared in two more feature films: Huckleberry Finn in 1931 and Lena Rivers in 1932.

Around that time, Paramount was looking for a young girl to play in their new movie version of Alice in Wonderland, and over 6,800 were auditioned. A Paramount talent scout saw Charlotte in the play and arranged a screen test on a Monday morning. One week to the day later, Henry began filming the high-budget classic. The studio's press department made much of her uncanny resemblance to the character as she appeared in the original Tenniel drawings. The 1933 picture garnered unanimous praise for Charlotte. In 1933, she appeared in the film Man Hunt as Josie Woodward.

Paramount lent her to Hal Roach for Babes in Toyland with Laurel and Hardy that was released by Metro-Goldwyn-Mayer. She appeared as Mlle. Kitty in Charlie Chan at the Opera (1936). She was released from her contract, but continued to make films. She made around 30 films, some as the star, but more often in supporting roles, mostly between 1930 and '37, followed by more modelling, and then five more in 1941–42. Discouraged by the low quality of the work she was being offered, in her own words: "I simply lost interest".

Jungle Menace
In his autobiography, director Harry L. Fraser described filming the scene in Jungle Menace during which a boa constrictor attacks the heroine Dorothy (Charlotte Henry). The villain has tied Dorothy hand and foot and she thrashes about wildly, terrified when she suddenly sees the huge snake:

Stage
Henry said that her success as a child actress left her "typed, definitely typed" and cited the difficulty of proving "that I am quite capable of playing serious adult parts." The resulting lack of work in films led her to act on stage in production of the Federal Theatre Project.

Later life and death
Henry retired from the movies and moved from Hollywood to San Diego, where she ran an employment agency with her mother. She then became executive secretary for 15 years to the Roman Catholic Bishop of San Diego, Charles F. Buddy. She was married to Dr. James Dempsey and continued with her acting, appearing in several stage productions at the San Diego Old Globe Theatre.

Henry died of cancer at age 66 in 1980. The San Diego Union newspaper carried the obituary and noted that she was buried at Holy Cross Cemetery.

Filmography

References

External links
 

 

1914 births
1980 deaths
Actresses from New York City
Actresses from San Diego
American child actresses
American film actresses
American stage actresses
Deaths from cancer in California
People from Brooklyn
Burials in California
20th-century American actresses